Absardeh or Ab Sardeh may refer to:

Ab Sardeh, Chaharmahal and Bakhtiari
Absardeh, Aligudarz, a village in Aligudarz County, Lorestan Province, Iran
Kalateh Absardeh, a village in Borujerd County, Lorestan Province, Iran
Ab Sardeh-ye Sofla, a village in Borujerd County, Lorestan Province, Iran
Qaleh-ye Absardeh, a village in Borujerd County, Lorestan Province, Iran
Absardeh, Khorramabad, a village in Khorramabad County, Lorestan Province, Iran